not to be confused with Slimane Hadj Abderrahmane

Hadj Abderrahmane (Arabic:حاج عبد الرحمان; October 12, 1941 - October 5, 1981)  was an Algerian actor from Télemly, Algiers. He was best known for his portrayal of Inspector Tahar alongside his shorter sidekick Yahia Ben Mabrouk, in the Adventures of Inspector Tahar film comedy series in the late 1960s and 1970s.

Biography 
Abderrahmane began as a  technical operator and cameraman. Before embarking on the adventures of Inspector Tahar, he  appeared in the theatre with Allel El Mouhib, who was his drama teacher.

Abderrahmane played the monk in the play Montserrat by Emmanuel Robles. He was a parish priest in Fusils de la mère Carare. His social life, his childhood, his nature, and his deepest feelings were related to the drama but the performance was seen as comical overall.

In 1967 he starred as Inspector Taher in the film L'Inspecteur mène l'enquête, directed by Moussa Haddad which spawned several sequels, including Les Vacances de l'inspecteur Tahar (1973) and  L'inspecteur marque le but (1977).

He was preparing to shoot Le cadavre du domaine when he died on October 5, 1981 in Paris.

Filmography 

 L'Inspecteur mène l'enquête - 1967 Moustapha Badie
 La Souris - 1968
 La Poursuite - 1968
  - 1973
 Inspector Tahar scors the goal - 1977
 The cat - 1978

References 

Algerian male stage actors
1941 births
1981 deaths
People from Algiers
20th-century Algerian male actors
Algerian male film actors